The history of Jerusalem during the Middle Ages is generally one of decline; beginning as a major city in the Byzantine Empire, Jerusalem prospered during the early centuries of Muslim control (637/38–969), but under the rule of the Fatimid caliphate (late 10th to 11th centuries) its population decreased from about 200,000 to less than half that number by the time of the Christian conquest in 1099. The Christians massacred much of the population as they took the city, and while population quickly recovered during the Kingdom of Jerusalem, it was again decimated to below 2,000 people when the Khwarezmi Turks took the city in 1244. After this, the city remained a backwater of the late medieval Muslim empires and would not again exceed a population of 10,000 until the 16th century.
It was passed back and forth through various Muslim factions until decidedly conquered by the Ottomans in 1517, who maintained control until the British took it in 1917.

Terminology
The term Middle Ages (in other words: the medieval period) in regard to the history of Jerusalem, is defined by archaeologists such as S. Weksler-Bdolah as the time span consisting of the 12th and 13th centuries.

Byzantine rule
Jerusalem reached a peak in size and population at the end of the Second Temple period: The city covered two square kilometers (0.8 sq mi.) and had a population of 200,000. In the five centuries following the Bar Kokhba revolt in the 2nd century, the city remained under Roman then Byzantine rule. During the 4th century, the Roman Emperor Constantine I constructed Christian sites in Jerusalem such as the Church of the Holy Sepulchre.

John Cassian, a Christian monk and theologian who spent several years in Bethlehem during the late 4th century, wrote that 'Jerusalem can be taken in four senses: historically as the city of the Jews; allegorically as 'Church of Christ', analogically as the heavenly city of God 'which is the mother of us all,' topologically, as the soul of man".

In 603, Pope Gregory I commissioned the Ravennate Abbot Probus, who was previously Gregory's emissary at the Lombard court, to build a hospital in Jerusalem to treat and care for Christian pilgrims to the Holy Land. In 800, Charlemagne enlarged Probus' hospital and added a library to it, but it was destroyed in  1005 by Al-Hakim bi-Amr Allah along with three thousand other buildings in Jerusalem.

From the days of Constantine until the Arab conquest in 637/38, despite intensive lobbying by Judeo-Byzantines, Jews were forbidden to enter the city. Following the Arab capture of Jerusalem, the Jews were allowed back into the city by Muslim rulers such as Umar ibn al-Khattab. 
During the 8th to 11th centuries, Jerusalem's prominence gradually diminished as the Arab powers in the region jockeyed for control.

Early Muslim period (637/38–1099)

Crusader control

Reports of the renewed killing of Christian pilgrims, and the defeat of the Byzantine Empire by the Seljuqs, led to the First Crusade. Europeans marched to recover the Holy Land, and on July 15, 1099, Christian soldiers were victorious in the one-month Siege of Jerusalem. In keeping with their alliance with the Muslims, the Jews had been among the most vigorous defenders of Jerusalem against the Crusaders. When the city fell, the Crusaders slaughtered most of the city's Muslim and Jewish inhabitants, leaving the city "knee deep in blood".

Jerusalem became the capital of the Kingdom of Jerusalem. Christian settlers from the West set about rebuilding the principal shrines associated with the life of Christ. The Church of the Holy Sepulchre was ambitiously rebuilt as a great Romanesque church, and Muslim shrines on the Temple Mount (the Dome of the Rock and the Al-Aqsa Mosque) were converted for Christian purposes.
The Military Orders of the Knights Hospitaller and the Knights Templar were established during this period. 
Both grew out of the need to protect and care for the great influx of pilgrims traveling to Jerusalem, especially since Bedouin enslavement raids and terror attacks upon the roads by the remaining Muslim population continued. King Baldwin II of Jerusalem allowed the forming order of the Templars to set up a headquarters in the captured Al-Aqsa Mosque. The Crusaders believed the Mosque to have been built on top of the ruins of the Temple of Solomon (or rather his royal palace), and therefore referred to the Mosque as "Solomon's Temple", in Latin "Templum Solomonis". It was from this location that the Order took its name of "Temple Knights" or "Templars".

Under the Kingdom of Jerusalem the area experienced a great revival, including the re-establishment of the city and harbour of Caesarea, the restoration and fortification of the city of Tiberias, the expansion of the city of Ashkelon, the walling and rebuilding of Jaffa, the reconstruction of Bethlehem, the repopulation of dozens of towns, the restoration of large agriculture, and the construction of hundreds of churches, cathedrals, and castles.
The old hospice, rebuilt in 1023  on the site of the monastery of Saint John the Baptist, was expanded into an infirmary under Hospitaller grand master Raymond du Puy de Provence near the Church of the Holy Sepulchre.

In 1173 Benjamin of Tudela visited Jerusalem. He described it as a small city full of Jacobites, Armenians, Greeks, and Georgians. Two hundred Jews dwelt in a corner of the city under the Tower of David.

In 1187, with the Muslim world united under the effective leadership of Saladin, Jerusalem was re-conquered by the Muslims after a successful siege. As part of this same campaign the armies of Saladin conquered, expelled, enslaved, or killed the remaining Christian communities of Galilee, Samaria, Judea, as well as the coastal towns of Ashkelon, Jaffa, Caesarea, and Acre.

In 1219 the walls of the city were razed by order of Al-Mu'azzam, the Ayyubid sultan of Damascus. This rendered Jerusalem defenseless and dealt a heavy blow to the city's status.

Following another Crusade by the Holy Roman Emperor Frederick II in 1227, the city was surrendered by Saladin's descendant al-Kamil, in accordance with a diplomatic treaty in 1228. It remained under Christian control, under the treaty's terms that no walls or fortifications could be built in the city or along the strip which united it with the coast. In 1239, after the ten-year truce expired, Frederick ordered the rebuilding of the walls. But without the formidable Crusader army he had originally employed ten years previous, his goals were effectively thwarted when the walls were again demolished by an-Nasir Da'ud, the emir of Kerak, in the same year.

In 1243 Jerusalem was firmly secured into the power of the Christian Kingdom, and the walls were repaired. However, the period was extremely brief as a large army of Turkish and Persian Muslims was advancing from the north.

Khwarezmian control

Jerusalem fell again in 1244 to the Khawarezmi Turks, who had been displaced by the advance of the Mongols. As the Khwarezmians moved west, they allied with the Egyptians, under the Egyptian Ayyubid sultan Al-Malik al-Salih. He recruited his horsemen from the Khwarezmians, and directed the remains of the Khwarezmian Empire into the Levant, where he wanted to organize a strong defense against the Mongols. In keeping with his goal, the main effect of the Khwarezmians was to slaughter the local population, especially in Jerusalem. They invaded the city on July 11, 1244, and the city's citadel, the so-called Tower of David, surrendered on August 23. The Khwarezmians then ruthlessly decimated the population, leaving only 2,000 people, Christians and Muslims, still living in the city. This attack triggered the Europeans to respond with the Seventh Crusade, although the new forces of French king Louis IX never even achieved success in Egypt, let alone advancing as far as Palestine.

Ayyubid control
After having troubles with the Khwarezmians, the Muslim Sultan Al-Salih then began ordering armed expeditions to raid into Christian communities and capture men, women and children. Called razzias, or by their original Arabic name Ghazw (sing.: ghazwa or ghaza), the raids extended into Caucasia, the Black Sea, Byzantium, and the coastal areas of Europe. The newly enslaved were divided according to category. Women were either turned into maids or sex slaves. The men depending upon age and ability were made into servants or killed. Young boys and girls were sent to Imams where they were indoctrinated into Islam. According to ability the young boys were then made into eunuchs or sent into decades long training as slave soldiers for the sultan. Called Mamluks, this army of indoctrinated slaves were forged into a potent armed force. The Sultan then used his new Mamluk army to eliminate the Khwarezmians, and Jerusalem returned to Egyptian Ayyubid rule in 1247.

Mamluk control and Mongol raids

When al-Salih died, his widow, the slave Shajar al-Durr, took power as Sultana, which power she then transferred to the Mamluk leader Aybeg, who became Sultan in 1250. Meanwhile, the Christian rulers of Antioch and Cilician Armenia subjected their territories to Mongol authority, and fought alongside the Mongols during the Empire's expansion into Iraq and Syria. In 1260, a portion of the Mongol army advanced toward Egypt, and was engaged by the Mamluks in Galilee, at the pivotal Battle of Ain Jalut. The Mamluks were victorious, and the Mongols retreated. In early 1300, there were again some Mongol raids into the southern Levant, shortly after the Mongols had been successful in capturing cities in northern Syria; however, the Mongols occupied the area for only a few weeks, and then retreated again to Iran. The Mamluks regrouped and re-asserted control over the southern Levant a few months later, with little resistance.

There is little evidence to indicate whether or not the Mongol raids penetrated Jerusalem in either 1260 or 1300. Historical reports from the time period tend to conflict, depending on which nationality of historian was writing the report. There were also a large number of rumors and urban legends in Europe, claiming that the Mongols had captured Jerusalem and were going to return it to the Crusaders. However, these rumors turned out to be false. The general consensus of modern historians is that though Jerusalem may or may not have been subject to raids, that there was never any attempt by the Mongols to incorporate Jerusalem into their administrative system, which is what would be necessary to deem a territory "conquered" as opposed to "raided".

Mamluk rebuilding

Even during the conflicts, pilgrims continued to come in small numbers. Pope Nicholas IV negotiated an agreement with the Mamluk sultan to allow Latin clergy to serve in the Church of the Holy Sepulchre. With the Sultan's agreement, Pope Nicholas, a Franciscan himself, sent a group of friars to keep the Latin liturgy going in Jerusalem. With the city little more than a backwater, they had no formal quarters, and simply lived in a pilgrim hostel, until in 1300 King Robert of Sicily gave a large gift of money to the Sultan. Robert asked that the Franciscans be allowed to have the Sion Church, the Mary Chapel in the Holy Sepulchre, and the Nativity Cave, and the Sultan gave his permission. But the remainder of the Christian holy places were kept in decay.

Mamluk sultans made a point of visiting the city, endowing new buildings, encouraging Muslim settlement, and expanding mosques. During the reign of Sultan Baibars, the Mamluks renewed the Muslim alliance with the Jews and he established two new sanctuaries, one to Moses near Jericho and one to Salih near Ramla, to encourage numerous Muslim and Jewish pilgrims to be in the area at the same time as the Christians, who filled the city during Easter. In 1267 Nahmanides (also known as Ramban) made aliyah. In the Old City he established the Ramban Synagogue, the oldest active synagogue in Jerusalem. However, the city had no great political power, and was in fact considered by the Mamluks as a place of exile for out-of-favor officials. The city itself was ruled by a low-ranking emir.

Following the persecutions of Jews during the Black Death, a group of Ashkenazi Jews led by Rabbi Isaac Asir HaTikvah immigrated to Jerusalem and founded a yeshiva. This group was part of the nucleus of what later became a much larger community in the Ottoman period.

Ottoman era
In 1517, Jerusalem and its environs fell to the Ottoman Turks, who would maintain control of the city until the 20th century. Although the Europeans no longer controlled any territory in the Holy Land, Christian presence including Europeans remained in Jerusalem. During the Ottomans this presence increased as Greeks under Turkish Sultan patronage re-established, restored, or reconstructed Orthodox Churches, hospitals, and communities. This era saw the first expansion outside the Old City walls, as new neighborhoods were established to relieve the overcrowding that had become so prevalent. The first of these new neighborhoods included the Russian Compound and the Jewish Mishkenot Sha'ananim, both founded in 1860.

References

Bibliography

See also
Aelia Capitolina
Demographic history of Jerusalem
Kingdom of Jerusalem
Old City of Jerusalem

Medieval Jerusalem
Medieval cities